Admiral Bagley may refer to:

David H. Bagley (1920–1992), U.S. Navy admiral
David W. Bagley (1883–1960), U.S. Navy admiral
Worth H. Bagley (1924–2016), U.S. Navy admiral